Guillermo León Celis Montiel (born 8 May 1993) is a Colombian professional footballer who plays as a midfielder for Categoria Primera A club Deportes Tolima.

Club statistics

Notes

Honours

Club
Junior
Copa Colombia: 2015

Benfica
Primeira Liga: 2016–17
Supertaça Cândido de Oliveira: 2016

International
Colombia
Copa América: Third place 2016

References

External links
 
 

1993 births
Living people
People from Sincelejo
Colombian footballers
Colombian expatriate footballers
Association football midfielders
Barranquilla F.C. footballers
Atlético Junior footballers
S.L. Benfica footballers
Vitória S.C. players
Club Atlético Colón footballers
Categoría Primera A players
Argentine Primera División players
Primeira Liga players
Colombia under-20 international footballers
Colombia international footballers
Copa América Centenario players
Colombian expatriate sportspeople in Portugal
Colombian expatriate sportspeople in Argentina
Expatriate footballers in Portugal
Expatriate footballers in Argentina